The 1972 Algerian Cup Final was the 9th final of the Algerian Cup. The final took place on June 25, 1972, at Stade du 5 Juillet in Algiers. Hamra Annaba beat USM Alger 2–0 to win their first Algerian Cup.

Route to the final

Match

Pre-match 
This final saw Hamra Annaba qualify for the first time to the final, either from the opposite side USM Alger reaching the final for the fourth time in a row and is looking for its first title, The new thing in this final is Stade du 5 Juillet, where it was launched by President Houari Boumédiène. As for Hamra Annaba's journey to the final, the start was against CA Batna, then against ASPTT Alger, then he faced two clubs from Oran, MC Oran and SCM Oran, to qualify for the semi-final Where faced the defending champions MC Alger and won 2–1. As for USM Alger's, the beginning was from Round of 32, against WA Mostaganem, after which he faced MO Constantine and in the Quarter-final they faced USM Bel Abbès and won 2–0, To qualify for the semi-finals and in a derby match against NA Hussein Dey where did they win with one goal.

Summary

Match details

References

Cup
Algeria
Algerian Cup Finals
USM Alger matches